My Dear Karadi is a 1999 Malayalam comedy drama film written by the duo Udayakrishna-Siby K. Thomas and directed by Sandhya Mohan with Kalabhavan Mani in the lead role. Kalabhavan Mani appears as a bear in major parts of the film. The film was remade in Malay as Cinta Beruang (2012) by Rama Narayanan.

Plot
Manikantan is a zoo-keeper. A bear accidentally escapes the zoo, for which the hero is held responsible. He would lose his job if the bear is not found, and unemployment would considerably damage the prospect of his getting married with the girl he loves. The movie is all about how Manikantan dresses up as a bear to secure his job and marry his girlfriend.

Cast

References

External links
 

1990s Malayalam-language films
Indian comedy films
Films about bears
Films shot in Thiruvananthapuram
Malayalam films remade in other languages